Koti Sadat is a town and union council in Bannu District of Khyber-Pakhtunkhwa (formerly the North West Frontier province).

References

Union councils of Bannu District
Populated places in Bannu District